The 1987 Missouri Tigers football team was an American football team that represented the University of Missouri in the Big Eight Conference (Big 8) during the 1987 NCAA Division I-A football season. The team compiled a 5–6 record (3–4 against Big 8 opponents), finished in fifth place in the Big 8, and outscored its opponents by a combined total of 226 to 209. Woody Widenhofer was the head coach for the third of four seasons. The team played its home games at Faurot Field in Columbia, Missouri.

The team's statistical leaders included Robert Delpino with 750 rushing yards, John Stollenwerck with 831 passing yards, and Craig Lammers with 253 receiving yards.

Schedule

References

Missouri
Missouri Tigers football seasons
Missouri Tigers football